Hans-Peter "Hansi" Müller (born 27 July 1957) is a German former footballer who played as a midfielder. Both his parents were of Danube Swabian descent (German: Donauschwaben) that were displaced from Yugoslavia after World War II. His father was born in Bačka Palanka and his mother in Inđija, both towns part of the province Vojvodina in Serbia.

Club career
Müller began his career playing for his hometown side VfB Stuttgart. After the 1982 FIFA World Cup, he moved to Italy to play for Inter Milan for two seasons, and subsequently also spent a season with Como.

In 1985, he moved to Austria to play with FC Swarovski Tirol, where he ended his playing career in 1990.

International career
Müller made his international debut in 1978. While at Stuttgart, Müller took part in UEFA Euro 1980 with West Germany, aged 22, after a brief taste of action at the 1978 FIFA World Cup, where he started all four games. The tournament would prove to be Müller's international peak as they emerged victorious. He had a disappointing 1982 World Cup, and despite playing in the Italian league, he made his 42nd and last appearance for West Germany the following year. In total he scored five international goals.

After retirement
Müller was an official ambassador for the city of Stuttgart for the 2006 FIFA World Cup and Innsbruck at UEFA Euro 2008.

Style of play
Müller was an elegant midfield playmaker, who usually played in the middle of the pitch. He was known for his clever passing and excellent left foot, as well as his charismatic presence and leadership on the field.

Honours

Club
Swarovski Tirol
 Austrian Football Bundesliga: 1988–89, 1989–90
 Austrian Cup: 1987–88

International
West Germany
 UEFA European Championship: 1980
 FIFA World Cup Runner-up: 1982

Individual
 kicker Bundesliga Team of the Season: 1979–80, 1980–81
 UEFA European Championship Team of the Tournament: 1980
 Bravo Award: 1980

References

External links
 
 
 

1957 births
Living people
Footballers from Stuttgart
West German expatriate footballers
German footballers
Germany international footballers
Germany B international footballers
1978 FIFA World Cup players
UEFA Euro 1980 players
1982 FIFA World Cup players
UEFA European Championship-winning players
VfB Stuttgart players
Inter Milan players
Como 1907 players
FC Swarovski Tirol players
Bundesliga players
2. Bundesliga players
Expatriate footballers in Italy
West German expatriate sportspeople in Italy
Serie A players
Association football midfielders
Austrian Football Bundesliga players
Recipients of the Order of Merit of Baden-Württemberg
West German expatriate sportspeople in Austria
West German footballers